Halgurd Sakran National Park (HSNP) will be the first National Park in the mountains of Iraq.
  

Halgurd and Sakran Mountains are part of one of the most unspoiled areas in Kurdistan; the high elevations ensure that snow covers some parts of the summits of the highest peaks all years around. Preliminary approach for delineation and zoning of the envisaged Halgurd Sakran National Park in mountain areas around the city of Choman, identified using modern technology.

Notes

References
 
Geography of Iraqi Kurdistan